Konstantin Viktorovich Rausch (born 15 March 1990) is a former professional footballer who played as a left-back. Born in Germany, he represented the country at various youth levels before switching allegiance to the Russia senior national team.

Early life
Rausch was born in Kozhevnikovo, Tomsk Oblast, Russian SFSR to ethnic German parents. His family emigrated to Germany from Russia in 1996. His first friend in Germany could not pronounce "Konstantin" and instead called him "Kocka", a nickname still used by his teammates and coaches. Rausch is dual citizen of Russia and Germany.

Club career

Early career
Shortly after moving to Germany, Rausch started playing football at the local club, TuS Lachendorf. At the age of twelve he received an offer to join the youth team of Bundesliga side Hannover 96. He decided he was not mature enough for such a big club and instead joined another local side, SV Nienhagen. He finally joined Hannover two years later, rejecting offers from Werder Bremen and Feyenoord.

Hannover 96
When 96 first choice left full back Michael Tarnat and his replacement Christian Schulz were injured, Rausch debuted against VfB Stuttgart on 30 March 2008. He was aged 18, which made him the youngest player ever, to appear in Hannover's first squad. Rausch had a good game, but had to be substituted at half time after straining a muscle. Two days later, he signed his first professional contract, running until 2010. While Hannover favoured a longer contract, Rausch did not want to tie himself for too long.

VfB Stuttgart
After the end of his contract with Hannover on 1 July 2013, Rausch moved to VfB Stuttgart on a free transfer. On 5 May 2013, Konstantin Rausch signed a contract until June 2016 with VfB Stuttgart.

Darmstadt 98
On 6 July 2015, Rausch signed a one-year contract with SV Darmstadt 98.

Dynamo Moscow
On 21 January 2018, he signed with Russian club FC Dynamo Moscow. On 19 December 2020, Dynamo announced that he left the club as his contract expired.

1. FC Nürnberg and retirement
In summer 2022, after a season with 1. FC Nürnberg, Rausch retired from professional football.

International career

International youth teams
Rausch played for various German youth teams as a left full back or wing back, accumulating more than 30 appearances. His biggest success was a bronze medal at the 2007 FIFA U-17 World Cup, where he started in every game except for one, which he missed following a red card. After the tournament, he was awarded a Fritz Walter Medal in silver as the second most promising German football player of his age.

Senior team
In March 2011, Russian media quoted Rausch to be interested in playing for the Russia national team, but that the Russian Football Union never approached him. On 16 August 2017, he was called up for Russia for a friendly game against a club side Dynamo Moscow, which did not count as a full international match. He made his full international debut on 7 October 2017 in a friendly game against South Korea.

On 11 May 2018, he was included in Russia's extended 2018 FIFA World Cup squad. He was not included in the finalized World Cup squad due to back injury.

Career statistics

Club

International

Honours
Germany U17
FIFA U-17 World Cup: third place 2007

Individual
Fritz Walter Medal: 2007 in Silver (Category U17)
Fritz Walter Medal: 2009 in Silver (Category U19)

References

External links
Konstantin Rausch at the official German U18 page

Living people
1990 births
Russian people of German descent
German people of Russian descent
Russian emigrants to Germany
Citizens of Germany through descent
Sportspeople from Tomsk Oblast
Russian footballers
German footballers
Association football midfielders
Association football fullbacks
Russia international footballers
Germany under-21 international footballers
Germany youth international footballers
Bundesliga players
3. Liga players
Regionalliga players
Oberliga (football) players
Russian Premier League players
Hannover 96 II players
Hannover 96 players
VfB Stuttgart players
VfB Stuttgart II players
SV Darmstadt 98 players
1. FC Köln players
FC Dynamo Moscow players
1. FC Nürnberg players
1. FC Nürnberg II players